Shiloh Hoganson (born April 25, 1993), previously known mononymously as Shiloh and currently performing under the stage name Lyldoll, is a Canadian pop and trap singer-songwriter. Shiloh has performed with Stereos, Hedley, Marianas Trench, and Faber Drive, and has been credited for writing in various hit songs, such as "Tonight I'm Getting Over You" by Carly Rae Jepsen. She has a mezzo-soprano vocal range.

Early life
Shiloh was born in Abbotsford, British Columbia, and was raised in several locations in Saskatchewan as well as Edmonton, Alberta. Shiloh has Italian and Puerto Rican ancestry. She is also of Swedish, Ojibwe, Cree and Métis descent. She attended Allendale Junior High School until she was 13. Growing up, Shiloh was inspired by Michael Jackson and entered singing contests and competitions, starting at the age of 7, including a radio contest for The Bounce (91.7 CHBN-FM) in Edmonton, Alberta, which she won in 2006.

Career

2008–2010: Picture Imperfect and Can't Hold On
Shiloh traveled to Vancouver, British Columbia to work with songwriting–production team Hipjoint Productions, who wrote and produced seven songs on her debut album Picture Imperfect including the Canadian platinum-selling single "Operator (A Girl Like Me)".

She signed to Universal Music Canada in 2008 and to Universal Republic in early 2009, and released her debut album, Picture Imperfect, on August 18, 2009. The album yielded three singles.

"Operator (A Girl Like Me)" was the first single from Picture Imperfect. It charted on the Canadian Hot 100 and listed her as Billboard Canada's No. 1 Emerging Talent Artist as of December 19, 2008. The song is also included on Much Dance 2009 CD. Shiloh appeared on MuchOnDemand on June 4, 2009, and performed "Goodbye, You Suck". She was a nominee for the 2009 MuchMusic Video Awards as well as being an announced performer. She performed "Operator (A Girl Like Me)" at the MuchMusic Video Awards on June 21, 2009, but lost in both categories she was nominated in: Pop Video of the Year to Danny Fernandes and UR Fave: New Artist to The Midway State.

Shiloh appeared on YTV's The Zone segment and was interviewed by Carlos, answering viewer questions that had been submitted by e-mail and performing. She also appeared on season two of The Next Star, meeting the six finalists.

On August 27, 2009, she performed an acoustic cover of Michael Jackson's Man in the Mirror as a tribute to him at the Hamilton Place Theatre.

On December 1, 2009, she was also featured on War Child: 10, where she collaborated with The Cliks to cover Patti Smith's "People Have The Power".

On November 9, 2010, she released her final single as Shiloh, "Can't Hold On".

2016–2019: 1993
In 2016, Future 5th took over Shiloh's management from Tanjola. After her father passed away, she was inspired to make music once again and began work on her new album later titled 1993.

In 2017, Shiloh changed her stage name to Doll and later released a demo track called "Alien".

While the release of the album was delayed for personal issues, she released a demo called "Stealin'" on SoundCloud on January 28, 2018. The demo was no longer available on SoundCloud for some time. At a unknown time, it went back up.

On September 13, 2018, Shiloh released the first single "SWM" from the delayed album. Around this time, she changed her stage name from Doll to Lyldoll. A second single, "New Love", was released on November 2, 2019, accompanied by a music video for the song was released on her Vevo channel. On November 15, 2019, she released the album 1993.

In April 2020, while in quarantine, she started working on a music video for the song Pillz, however it is presumed that the music video is cancelled since the updates are now deleted.

2021: Girl Gxd 
On May 31, 2021, Lyldoll released the single "Rainbow" on streaming platforms. On a Instagram livestream, Hoganson  announced that Rainbow was a teaser single for a new album and she also said she is going back to Los Angeles.

On October 1, 2021, Lyldoll released her third studio album titled Girl Gxd.

2022: Unborn (Collaboration) 
On April 21, 2022, Youtuber Jayniac Jr. (Darron Bailey Jr.) released the EP "Unborn" which included two covers of "Operator" in collaboration with Lyldoll.

Onision controversy
In 2019, allegations of child grooming and abuse were levied at Hoganson's former partner, YouTube personality Greg Jackson, known online as Onision. Shortly thereafter, Shiloh appeared on Chris Hansen's YouTube show, Have a Seat With Chris Hansen, where she alleged abuse at the hands of Onision. Also in 2019, a YouTube sketch video of Shiloh and Onision was discovered, showing Onision’s alleged abuse of Shiloh.

Discography

Albums

Singles

 2006
 "All I Want"
 2008
 "Operator (A Girl Like Me)"
 2009
 "Goodbye, You Suck"
 "Alright"
 "I Remember"
 2010
 "Can't Hold On"
 2018
 "Stealin'"
 "SWM"
 2019
 "New Love”
 "Pillz”
 "Higher”
 2021
 “Rainbow”
 “Girl Gxd”
 “Pieces”
 “Demonz”

Awards and nominations

References

External links

 Shiloh official site
 Shiloh on Hipjoint Productions Site
 Future5th
 Former YouTube channel
Current YouTube channel
Twitter (music)

1993 births
21st-century Canadian women singers
Canadian women pop singers
Canadian people of Cree descent
Canadian people of Italian descent
Canadian people of Puerto Rican descent
Canadian people of Swedish descent
Canadian singer-songwriters
Living people
Musicians from British Columbia
People from Abbotsford, British Columbia
Canadian people of Métis descent
Ojibwe people